Eddy Vanhaerens (born 23 February 1954) is a Belgian former racing cyclist.

Major results

1976
 1st Omloop van de Westhoek
 2nd Kattekoers
1977
 1st Stage 3a Volta a Catalunya
 2nd Schaal Sels
 2nd Omloop van de Vlaamse Scheldeboorden
 2nd Omloop Mandel-Leie-Schelde
 2nd Omloop van het Zuidwesten
 2nd GP du Tournaisis
 7th Grand Prix Cerami
1978
 3rd GP du Tournaisis
 6th Omloop van het Houtland
 8th GP Stad Vilvoorde
 8th De Kustpijl
 9th Kampioenschap van Vlaanderen
 9th Schaal Sels
1980
 1st Stage 5b Four Days of Dunkirk
 2nd Grote Prijs Marcel Kint
 3rd Paris–Tours
1981
 4th Kampioenschap van Vlaanderen
 7th Dwars door België
 7th Ronde van Limburg
 8th Gent–Wevelgem
 8th E3 Prijs Vlaanderen
 8th Brussels–Ingooigem
1982
 1st Grand Prix de Denain
 1st Stages 15a & 19 Vuelta a España
 1st Omloop van het Houtland
 1st Stage 2 Ronde van Nederland
 2nd Road race, National Road Championships
 2nd Overall Vuelta a Aragón
1st Points classification
1st Stages 1, 2 & 3a
 2nd Gent–Wevelgem
 2nd GP Stad Zottegem
 2nd Omloop van het Houtland
 3rd Dwars door België
 6th Kuurne–Brussels–Kuurne
 7th Nokere Koerse
1983
 1st Stages 1 & 7 Vuelta a Aragón
 3rd Omloop van het Houtland
 4th Nationale Sluitingprijs
 5th Grand Prix Impanis-Van Petegem
 9th Scheldeprijs
 10th Nationale Sluitingprijs
1984
 1st Stage 3 Volta a Catalunya
 3rd Circuit des Frontières
 4th Omloop van het Houtland
1985
 1st Kampioenschap van Vlaanderen
 1st Brussels–Ingooigem
 3rd Nationale Sluitingprijs
 9th Le Samyn
1986
 1st Stage 2 Danmark Rundt
 2nd Omloop Schelde-Durme
 3rd Brussels–Ingooigem
 9th Grand Prix Impanis-Van Petegem
 9th De Kustpijl
1987
 8th Omloop van het Houtland
 8th Nokere Koerse
 9th Kuurne–Brussels–Kuurne
 10th Kampioenschap van Vlaanderen
1988
 4th Kampioenschap van Vlaanderen

External links 

1954 births
Living people
Belgian male cyclists
Belgian Vuelta a España stage winners
People from Torhout
Cyclists from West Flanders